Xiao Taotao (born Roberto Siucho Neira; 7 February 1997) is a professional footballer who plays for Universitario. Taotao is a former youth international for Peru, before renouncing his citizenship and gaining Chinese nationality.

Club career
Xiao Taotao joined Peruvian club Universitario's youth academy in 2010 and was promoted to the first team in July 2013. On 14 July 2013, he made his senior debut in a 0–0 draw against Real Garcilaso at the age of 16. He became a regular player in the 2015 season and scored his first senior goal on 9 August 2015 against Sport Loreto.

On 31 January 2019, Universitario announced Xiao had transferred to Chinese Super League side Guangzhou Evergrande Taobao. In February 2019, Siucho was loaned to China League One side Shanghai Shenxin for the 2019 season.

On 14 February 2020, when the soccerplayer was still called Roberto Siucho, he renounced his Peruvian nationality and only kept the Chinese nationality that he had just obtained. For this reason, he changed his name from Roberto Siucho to Xiao Taotao, remaining with the latter definitively.

International career
Xiao Taotao was called to play for Peru at U17 and U20 level, playing in the 2013 South American U-17 Championship, 2015 South American U-20 Championship and 2017 South American U-20 Championship.

Personal life
Xiao's grandfather was from Dachong Town, Xiangshan County, Guangdong, China. His family name is transliterated from Chinese surname Xiao. His sister, Ana, married to Peru's international footballer Edison Flores, making him brother-in-law to Edison.

Career statistics

See also 
List of Chinese naturalized footballers

References

1997 births
Living people
People from Lima
Peruvian footballers
Peru youth international footballers
Chinese footballers
Peruvian people of Chinese descent
Chinese people of Peruvian descent
Association football forwards
Club Universitario de Deportes footballers
Guangzhou F.C. players
Shanghai Shenxin F.C. players
Kunshan F.C. players
Peruvian Primera División players
Chinese Super League players
China League One players
Naturalized citizens of the People's Republic of China